FC Fakel Voronezh is a Soviet and Russian professional football club based in Voronezh. Founded in 1947, the club has played in the Soviet Top League and the Russian Premier League. The club will play in the Russian Premier League in the 2022–23 season. The club holds the record for fan attendance in Eastern Europe.

History
The club was founded in 1947 at a then classified airplane plant. For reasons of secrecy, the team was not officially given a name and was referred to as the Voronezh city team. In 1959 the team became a part of Trud sports society and was renamed Trud Voronezh. In 1977 the team was renamed Fakel, meaning "Torch".

The team played in the Soviet League since 1954:
1954–1960 in Class B
1961 in Class A (Soviet Top League)
1962 in Class B
1963–1970 in Class A, Group 2
1971–1978 in Second League
1979–1984 in First League
1985 in Top League
1986–1987 in First League
1988 in Second League
1989–1991 in First League

The club's best results were 15th place in the Top Division in 1961 and 17th in 1985. Fakel reached the semifinal of the Soviet Cup in 1984.

In the Russian league, Fakel played in various divisions, only on two occasions staying in the same division for more than two consecutive seasons:
Top Division: 1961, 1985, 1992, 1997, 2000–2001, 2022/23
First Division: 1993, 1995–1996, 1998–1999, 2002–2003, 2005–2006, 2011–2012, 2015–2022
Second Division: 1994, 2004, 2010, 2012–2015
Russian Amateur Football League: 2007–2008

The best finish achieved by Fakel in the Premier League was 13th in 2000.  The club has won 3 Second Division titles.

Fakel has also experienced several short-lived name changes: to Fakel-Profsoyuz in 1992, Voronezh in 2002 and Fakel-Voronezh in 2002–2003.

Fakel and FC Yelets were excluded from the Russian Second Division for attempts to bribe and threaten the referee on 18 July 2009. At the time of exclusion (21 August), Fakel were sixth with 31 points from 19 games, while Yelets were 16th with 9 points from 19 games.

A new club called FC Fakel Voronezh technically independent from the club that played in 2009 as FC Fakel-Voronezh Voronezh was founded in 2010 and played in the Russian Second Division (FSA Voronezh failed licensing for 2010 and the new Fakel was the only Voronezh professional team for 2010). It employed the manager and 6 players from the 2009 FC Fakel-Voronezh roster. The reserve team FC Fakel-d Voronezh played in the Amateur Football League in 2010 (view – FC Fakel-M Voronezh).

Before the 2011–12 season FC Saturn Moscow Oblast dropped out of Russian Premier League due to financial problems. FC Krasnodar replaced them in the Premier League, creating a vacancy in the Russian First Division. Despite only coming in 4th in their Russian Second Division zone in 2010, Fakel volunteered to take the First Division spot, and the Russian Football Union decided to promote the team. They were relegated back to the third level in the same 2011–12 season. They returned to the Russian Football National League in the 2015–16 season. Despite finishing in the relegation zone at the end of the 2017–18 season, the club was not relegated as other clubs ahead in the standings failed to obtain the league license for 2018–19.

They finished in the relegation zone once again in the 2018–19 season, but due to failure of FC Sakhalin Yuzhno-Sakhalinsk and FC Anzhi Makhachkala to acquire a 2019–20 license, they were not relegated.

The 2019–20 season was abandoned due to the COVID-19 pandemic in Russia with Fakel once again in relegation spot. However, due to the pandemic, none of the teams, including Fakel, were relegated.

Fakel finished 2nd in the 2021–22 Russian Football National League to secure promotion to the Russian Premier League for the first time since the 2001 season.

Current squad
As of 22 February 2023, according to the Premier League website.

Out on loan

Reserve squad
Fakel's reserve squad played professionally as FC Fakel-d Voronezh in the Russian Third League in 1997. It re-entered professional football as FC Fakel-M Voronezh for the 2020–21 season.

Notable players
Had international caps for their respective countries. Players whose name is listed in bold represented their countries while playing for Fakel.

Russia/USSR
 Viktor Losev
 Valeri Shmarov
  Valery Karpin
 Aleksandr Filimonov
 Lyubomir Kantonistov
 Arseniy Logashov
 Artyom Makarchuk
 Andrei Novosadov
 Maksim Osipenko
 Ivan Saenko
 Roman Vorobyov
 Valery Yesipov
 Anton Zabolotny

Former USSR countries
 Stanislav Buchnev
 Tarlan Ahmadov
 Shahin Diniyev
 Gurban Gurbanov
 Anton Amelchenko
 Radaslaw Arlowski
 Eduard Boltrushevich
 Andrei Kovalenko
 Vitali Lanko
 Yuri Shukanov
 Ihar Tarlowski
 Valeriy Gorbach
 Andriy Yudin
 Andrey Akopyants

 Igor Kichigin
 Vladimir Shishelov
 Oļegs Aleksejenko
 Oļegs Karavajevs
 Juris Laizāns
 Raimonds Laizāns
 Ivans Lukjanovs
 Aivaras Laurišas
 Edgaras Jankauskas
 Andrius Jokšas
 Pavelas Leusas
 Andrius Sriubas
Europe
 Emilian Dolha
 Nemanja Pejčinović

Coaching staff

References

External links
Official website 

 
Association football clubs established in 1947
Football clubs in Russia
Sport in Voronezh
1947 establishments in Russia
Soviet Top League clubs
Works association football clubs in Russia